The Nevis River is in Otago, New Zealand. It flows north for  through rough country before meeting the Kawarau River, of which it is a tributary. A prominent rock outcrop close to this junction is known as the Nevis Bluff.

The river was one of the sites of the Central Otago goldrush of the 1860s. Today, the region around the river is known for tourism and wine production. New Zealand's highest bungy jumping operation, the  Nevis Highwire is above the river.

A Water Conservation Order protects the river for its wild and scenic character and for recreational use, especially fishing and kayaking. The Water Conservation Order made provision for damming the river for hydro-electric development.  Fish and Game New Zealand applied to have this provision revoked and in 2013, after a public process with consideration by a special tribunal and the Environment Court, the Environment Minister decided to prevent damming of the river.

References 

Rivers of Otago
Rivers of New Zealand